Apamea inordinata is a moth of the family Noctuidae. It is found in the United States, including New York, Massachusetts, Pennsylvania, Colorado, and California. In Canada it is found in Ontario, Quebec, New Brunswick, Nova Scotia, British Columbia, Alberta, Saskatchewan and Manitoba.  Its wingspan is about 34 mm. The species is listed as threatened in Connecticut.

Subspecies
Apamea inordinata inordinata (Morrison, 1875)
Apamea inordinata semilunata (Grote, 1881)
Apamea inordinata olympia Crabo, 2009

References

External links
Image

Apamea (moth)
Moths of North America
Moths described in 1875